Kevin Fowler is an American Texas Country artist. His discography comprises nine studio albums, one compilation album, one live album and sixteen singles.

Studio albums

Compilation albums

Live albums

Singles

Music videos

References

Discographies of American artists
Country music discographies